Rīgas Armijas Sporta Klubs was a professional basketball club that was based in Riga, Latvia.

History
Rīgas ASK was founded in 1931, and started playing in the Latvian Basketball Championship. In the years that Latvia was controlled by the Soviet Union, the club was a member of the USSR Premier League, which lasted until 1991 (and to 1992 as the CIS Unified League). In 1953, head coach Alexander Gomelsky came to the club, and he remained with it until 1966.

Almost immediately, Gomelsky led ASK to the top of the USSR League, as he and the club's star player, Jānis Krūmiņš, led them to USSR League championships in 1955, 1957, and 1958, and also to the top of the European-wide top-tier level, by winning the FIBA European Champions Cup (now called EuroLeague) three times in a row, in 1958, 1959, and 1960. As well as to the final in 1961.

In 1997, Rīgas ASK merged with BK Brocēni, and the new club of BK ASK Brocēni was thus created. In 2004, a new club, under the name of BK Rīga was founded; and in 2006, it was renamed to ASK Rīga, after gaining the support of Riga City Council, the National Latvian Army Forces, and some powerful sponsors.

Honours
Total titles: 6

Domestic competitions
 USSR Premier League
 Champions (3): 1954–55, 1956–57, 1957–58
 Runners-up (2): 1961–62, 1963–64

European competitions
 EuroLeague
 Champions (3): 1958, 1958–59, 1959–60
 Runners-up (1): 1960–61

Notable players

  Romanas Brazdauskis
  Alvils Gulbis
  Jānis Krūmiņš
  Aivar Kuusmaa
  Jaak Lipso
  Valdis Muižnieks
  Rauno Pehka
  Maigonis Valdmanis

Head coaches
  Gunārs Baldzēns (1953)
  Alexander Gomelsky (1953–1966)
  Maigonis Valdmanis (1966–1969)
  Gunārs Baldzēns (1969–1970)
  Juris Kalniņš (1970–1971)
  Jānis Zeltiņš (1971–1974 & 1987–1988)
  Valentīns Meļņičuks (1974–1981)
  Nikolajs Bolvačovs (1981–1986 & 1988)
  Aleksandrs Gostevs (1988)
  Armands Krauliņš (1989–1990)
  Pēteris Višņēvics (1990–1991)

References

1997 disestablishments in Latvia
Basketball teams established in 1931
Basketball teams in Latvia
Basketball teams in the Soviet Union
EuroLeague-winning clubs
Sport in Riga